Chhom Pisa (born 03 March 1995) is a Cambodian footballer who plays as a centre back for Phnom Penh Crown in the Cambodian League and the Cambodia national team.

Honours

Club
Phnom Penh Crown
 Cambodian Premier League: 2014, 2015, 2021, 2022
 Cambodian Super Cup: 2022
 Cambodian League Cup: 2022

References

External links
 

1995 births
Living people
Cambodian footballers
Cambodia international footballers
Association football defenders
Phnom Penh Crown FC players